Hakob Mkrtchyan (born 8 March 1997) is an Armenian male weightlifter, World Champion and European Champion competing in the 77 kg and 85 kg categories until 2018 and 89 kg starting in 2018 after the International Weightlifting Federation reorganized the categories.

Career
He won the 77 kg class at the 2014 Summer Youth Olympics, and in doing so became the first Armenian to win a gold medal at the Summer Youth Olympics.

In 2018 he competed at the 2018 World Weightlifting Championships winning a silver medal in the clean & jerk.

Major results

References

External links

living people
1997 births
Armenian male weightlifters
Weightlifters at the 2014 Summer Youth Olympics
World Weightlifting Championships medalists
Youth Olympic gold medalists for Armenia
European Weightlifting Championships medalists
21st-century Armenian people